Zoran Todorov (Macedonian: Зоран Тодоров; born 31 October 1982) is a Macedonian retired footballer.

Club career
Born in Kočani, SR Macedonia, SFR Yugoslavia, he started his career playing with his local club FK Osogovo in the Macedonian First League. Afterwards, he moved to Serbia where he played until 2005 in the Second League of Serbia and Montenegro with FK Bečej and FK Mačva Šabac. After a season with FK Palić in 2005, Todorov returned to Mačva playing in the same level, in the renamed Serbian First League (PLS). In the summer of 2007 he moved to FK Zemun; however, after their relegation in 2008 he was loaned to FK Voždovac playing back in the PLS. Regular playing time helped him sign a three-year contract with Serbian SuperLiga side FK Smederevo in the summer of 2009.

Administrative career
In December 2017, Zoran was announced as Youth Coordinator of FK Osogovo.

References

External links
 Profile at FK Smederevo official website
 
 Zoran Todorov Stats at Utakmica.rs

1982 births
Living people
People from Kočani
Association football midfielders
Macedonian footballers
FK Osogovo players
OFK Bečej 1918 players
FK Radnički Klupci players
FK Mačva Šabac players
FK Palić players
FK Zemun players
FK Voždovac players
FK Smederevo players
Serbian First League players
Serbian SuperLiga players
Macedonian expatriate footballers
Expatriate footballers in Serbia
Macedonian expatriate sportspeople in Serbia